The Tour d'Algérie is an annual multi-day road cycling race held in Algeria. It has been held as a 2.2 category event on UCI Africa Tour since 2011, with the exception of 2017 and 2022 when it was held on the national calendar.

Winners

References

Cycle races in Algeria
1949 establishments in Algeria
Recurring sporting events established in 1949
UCI Africa Tour races